Tropical Cyclone Dineo was one of the deadliest tropical cyclones on record in the South-West Indian Ocean and Southern Hemisphere as a whole. It was the first tropical cyclone to hit Mozambique since Cyclone Jokwe in 2008.

Meteorological history

The origins of Dineo can be tracked back to a cluster of thunderstorms that organized into an area of low pressure in the Mozambique Channelon February 11. Over the next two days, the system gradually drifted in a generally southern track as it gained intensity and prompted the JTWC to issue a TCFA. On February 13, RSMC La Réunion declared that a Tropical Disturbance had formed in the area and began issuing advisories. Located in a very favorable environment, the depression quickly increased in intensity and both the RSMC and JTWC noted winds of at least  later that day, with the RSMC subsequently naming the storm Dineo.

Impact 
Dineo struck Mozambique on February 15 as a tropical cyclone, bringing torrential rain and damaging winds. Dineo was the first tropical cyclone to hit Mozambique since Cyclone Jokwe in 2008. At least seven people were killed across the country, including a child crushed by a fallen tree in Massinga. An estimated 20,000 homes were destroyed and approximately 130,000 people were directly affected. Widespread flooding took place in Zimbabwe, with Mutare, Chiredzi, and Beitbridge particularly hard-hit. At least 271 people were killed by the storm and damage exceeded US$200 million. The storm's remnants triggered destructive floods in Botswana. In the month following the storm, a cholera outbreak in Mozambique and Malawi infected more than 1,200 people and claimed 2 lives.

See also 

 Weather of 2016 and 2017
 Tropical cyclones in 2016 and 2017
 Cyclone Jokwe – The last cyclone to hit Mozambique prior to Dineo
 Cyclone Idai – A similar, but stronger and deadlier cyclone

References 

Dineo
Cyclones in Mozambique
2017 in Mozambique
Dineo